Eduard Brovko ( Dnepropetrovsk, April 13, 1998, Dnepropetrovsk) was a Soviet male weightlifter, who competed in the middle heavyweight class and represented Soviet Union at international competitions. He won the bronze medal at the 1963 World Weightlifting Championships in the 90 kg category and the World (1963). Honored Master of Sports of the USSR (1966). Honored Trainer of the USSR (1979).

Biography 
Eduard Brovko was born on January 25, 1936, in Dnepropetrovsk. He began to do weightlifting under the leadership of Zinovy Arkhangorodsky. In 1961—1966 he was one of the leading Soviet light heavy athletes, three times became the champion of the USSR and twice the silver medalist of the championships of the country. In 1963, he participated in the World and European Championships in Stockholm and won the bronze medals of these competitions.

In 1964 he graduated from the National University of Ukraine on Physical Education and Sport. After completing his sports career, for many years he was the head coach of the Dnipropetrovsk Oblast in weightlifting and headed the regional federation in this sport. Among his most famous students are Olympic champion Sultan Rakhmanov.

Death 
Eduard Brovko died on April 13, 1998, and was buried in Dnepropetrovsk.

External links 
 Eduard Brovko
 Eduard Brovko
 TOP OLYMPIC LIFTERS OF THE 20TH CENTURY

References

1936 births
1998 deaths
Sportspeople from Dnipro
Ukrainian male weightlifters
Soviet male weightlifters
World Weightlifting Championships medalists
Place of birth missing